Mape is a village and suco (municipality) in Cova Lima District, East Timor in the southern Lesser Sunda Archipelago of Southeast Asia. Administratively, it is part of the Zumalai Subdistrict of Cova Lima District. The suco covers an area of 30.59 km², and the population was 308 in the 2010 census.

Notes

 

Populated places in East Timor
Cova Lima Municipality
Sucos of East Timor